Colvile may refer to:

SS Colvile, a Lake Winnipeg steamboat built for the Hudson's Bay Company
Colvile (surname), a common family name

See also
Colville (disambiguation)
Coalville